Elections to the French National Assembly were held in Senegal on 3 April 1871 as part of the wider French elections. Lafon de Fongaufier was elected.

Electoral system
The single Senegalese seat in the National Assembly had been abolished by a decree of 2 February 1852. However, it was restored in 1871.

Results

Aftermath
A new electoral law was passed in 1875 that did not mention Senegal, meaning no MP was elected in 1876. However, a decree of 1879 reinstated the seat.

References

Senegal
1871 in Senegal
Elections in Senegal